Ulverscroft is a civil parish in the Charnwood district of Leicestershire.  It has a population of about 100. The population in 2011 is included in the civil parish of Newtown Linford.  There is no village by the name, but there was previously an Ulverscroft Priory.

There are some good examples of early Arts and Crafts movement architecture in and around Ulverscroft including Stoneywell by Ernest Gimson. Stoneywell, now a National Trust property, opened to the public in 2015.

Notes

External links

 Ulverscroft Home Page

Civil parishes in Leicestershire
Borough of Charnwood
Villages in Leicestershire